Maximum City: Bombay Lost and Found is a narrative nonfiction book by Suketu Mehta, published in 2004, about the Indian city of Mumbai (also known as Bombay). It was published in hardcover by Random House's Alfred A. Knopf imprint. When released in paperback, it was published by Vintage, a subdivision of Random House.

Awards 
Maximum City was a finalist for the Pulitzer Prize in 2005, and won the Kiriyama Prize, an award given to books that foster a greater understanding of the nations and peoples of the Pacific Rim and South Asia. It won the 2005 Vodafone Crossword Book Award. The Economist named Maximum City one of its books of the year for 2004. It was shortlisted for the 2005 Samuel Johnson Prize.

Adaptation
In August 2019, it was reported that Anurag Kashyap will be the showrunner of franchise films based on the book. It will be produced by Ashok Amritraj.

References

External links

Suketu Mehta's official website
Publisher Random House website
Interview with the Wall Street Journal
Lettre Ulysses Award Biography Page on Suketu Mehta

2004 non-fiction books
Books about India
Novels set in Mumbai
Indian biographies
Mumbai in fiction
21st-century Indian books